Berta Riaza Gómez (27 July 1927 – 24 July 2022) was a Spanish actress. She starred in over 100 films and 60 stage productions during her near-60 year career.

Life
Born in Madrid, she began her career in 1947 on a stage play titled Historia de una casa. 

In 1959, she made her movie debut with Diez fusiles esperan. Her best known movie roles include: Entre tinieblas (1983), Luces de bohemia (1985), El placer de matar (1988) and El Puzzle (2000).

Her career mainly was focused on movies and stage roles. However, she appeared in a few television shows with Televisión Española. In 1980, she starred as Doña Guillermina in the miniseries Fortunata y Jacinta.

In 2003, Riaza retired saying that the only roles she was getting were in unpopular stage plays.

Awards
 National Theater Prize (1992)
  (1995)
  (1997)
 Gold Medal of Merit in the Fine Arts (2007)

References

External links 
 

1927 births
2022 deaths
Spanish film actors
Spanish television actors
Spanish stage actors
Spanish voice actors
Actors from Madrid